Taimuraz Ruslanovich Friev (born September 15, 1986, in Vladikavkaz) is a Russian freestyle wrestler of Ossetian descent representing Spain. He competed in the men's freestyle 74 kg event at the 2016 Summer Olympics, where he was eliminated in the Round of 32 by Liván López
.

He competed in the 86kg event at the 2022 World Wrestling Championships held in Belgrade, Serbia.

References

External links
 

1986 births
Living people
Spanish male sport wrestlers
Olympic wrestlers of Spain
Wrestlers at the 2016 Summer Olympics
Mediterranean Games bronze medalists for Spain
Mediterranean Games medalists in wrestling
Competitors at the 2018 Mediterranean Games
Wrestlers at the 2015 European Games
Wrestlers at the 2019 European Games
European Games competitors for Spain
World Wrestling Championships medalists